Daneil Nicholas Cyrus (born 15 December 1990) is a Trinidadian professional footballer who plays as a defender for the Trinidad and Tobago national team.

Professional 
Cyrus was born in Plymouth, Trinidad and Tobago. He was waived by Sporting Kansas City in February 2012 after spending part of the 2011 season with the Major League Soccer club. In July 2012 he signed for W Connection in the TT Pro League.

In May 2014, Cyrus went on loan to V.League 1 side Hà Nội T&T.

On 6 August 2015, Chicago Fire acquired Cyrus on loan. In August 2019, he was signed by Mohun Bagan to play in the 2019–20 I-League, and clinched the league title.

In 2022, Cyrus moved back to India signing with another I-League club Sudeva Delhi ahead of the 2022–23 season.

Honours

Mohun Bagan
I-League: 2019–20

Trinidad and Tobago
 Caribbean Cup runner-up: 2014

References

External links

1990 births
Living people
Association football defenders
Trinidad and Tobago footballers
Trinidad and Tobago international footballers
TT Pro League players
Morvant Caledonia United players
Sporting Kansas City players
W Connection F.C. players
Chicago Fire FC players
Hanoi FC players
V.League 1 players
Juticalpa F.C. players
Al-Orobah FC players
Expatriate soccer players in the United States
Expatriate footballers in Vietnam
Expatriate footballers in Saudi Arabia
Major League Soccer players
Saudi First Division League players
2013 CONCACAF Gold Cup players
2014 Caribbean Cup players
2015 CONCACAF Gold Cup players
Trinidad and Tobago expatriate footballers
Trinidad and Tobago expatriate sportspeople in the United States
Trinidad and Tobago expatriate sportspeople in Vietnam
2009 CONCACAF U-20 Championship players
2019 CONCACAF Gold Cup players
Trinidad and Tobago under-20 international footballers
Trinidad and Tobago youth international footballers
Calcutta Football League players